Club Unión Deportiva Canarias (usually called Canarias) was a Venezuelan professional football club founded in 1963, and based in Caracas.  The club had one First Division title in the professional era.

Titles

National
Primera División Venezolana: 1
Winners (1): 1968
Copa Venezuela: 2
Winners (2): 1963, 1968
Runner-up (3): 1964, 1966, 1969

Performance in CONMEBOL competitions
Copa Libertadores: 1 appearance
1969: First Round
Copa Ganadores de Copa: 1 appearance
1970: First Round

External links
 La UD Canarias levantó vuelo en Venezuela en 1968

Football clubs in Venezuela
Association football clubs established in 1963
1963 establishments in Venezuela
Football clubs in Caracas
Defunct football clubs in Venezuela